Eckhaus Latta is an American fashion brand. 

The brand is known for their use of unexpected materials, exploring texture and tactility in their designs, and for incorporating writing, performance, and video into their practice. In 2018, Eckhaus Latta opened a show, Possessed, at the Whitney Museum, the first fashion-related exhibition at the museum in 21 years. The label previously exhibited their work, a sculptural collage of fashion, fine art, and video, in group shows at the Hammer Museum, (2016) and MoMA PS1, (2015). Additionally, Eckhaus Latta was nominated for the 2018 Edition of the LVMH Prize.

History
The label was founded in 2011 by Mike Eckhaus and Zoe Latta. The two designers met as students at the Rhode Island School of Design, where Mike studied sculpture and Zoe textiles. In 2010, Eckhaus moved to NYC and began working as an accessories designer at Marc by Marc Jacobs while Latta ran a textiles business, Ruth Prince, selling prints to designers such as Calvin Klein and Proenza Schouler while designing knits for Opening Ceremony. Looking to move beyond the somewhat restricted commercial environments in which they worked, Eckhaus and Latta decided to design a collection together.

Collaborators
Eckhaus Latta periodically collaborates with those they find inspiring, from putting artists' sculptures into their store, to commissioning the furniture in their Los Angeles retail store, to working with Camper on a line of footwear. Eckhaus Latta amplifies their peers and engages in a spectrum of collaborations.

Unconventional models
Eckhaus Latta often uses non-professional or unconventional models in their advertising campaigns and runway shows. The label courted controversy with its first large-scale ad campaign when it showed adult models having unsimulated sex in the Spring 2017 collection.

References 

Luxury brands
American fashion designers
Clothing brands of the United States
Clothing companies based in New York City
Clothing companies based in Los Angeles
Clothing companies established in 2011